The 2000 FIA GT Brno 500 km was the ninth round the 2000 FIA GT Championship season.  It took place at the Masaryk Circuit, Czech Republic, on September 17, 2000.

Official results
Class winners in bold.  Cars failing to complete 70% of winner's distance marked as Not Classified (NC).

Statistics
 Pole position – #14 Lister Storm Racing – 2:00.157
 Fastest lap – #14 Lister Storm Racing – 2:14.128
 Average speed – 133.240 km/h

References

 
 
 

B
FIA GT